Band 'O Gypsys is a South African hard blues-rock band formed in 1962 that claims to have been one of the longest-running bands in the world.

Discography
 She's a mermaid (1995)
 I Want You To Know (2004)

Musical groups established in 1962
South African musical groups
1962 establishments in South Africa